Dr. Glenn R. Frye House is a historic home located at Hickory, Catawba County, North Carolina. It was built in 1937, and is a two-story, Colonial Revival style stone dwelling.  It has a -story frame wing.  Also on the property are the contributing garage (1937); wrought-iron balustrade, fence, and gates (1937); and stone wall (1937).

It was listed on the National Register of Historic Places in 2009.

References

Hickory, North Carolina
Houses on the National Register of Historic Places in North Carolina
Houses completed in 1937
Colonial Revival architecture in North Carolina
Houses in Catawba County, North Carolina
National Register of Historic Places in Catawba County, North Carolina
1937 establishments in North Carolina